"How Can I Tell Her" is a song by American singer-songwriter Lobo, from his third studio album Calumet. The song reached No. 22 on the US Billboard Hot 100 and No. 4 on the Adult Contemporary chart.

References

1973 singles
Lobo (musician) songs
1973 songs
Big Tree Records singles
Songs written by Lobo (musician)